Waylon Michael Murray (born 27 April 1986 in Durban, South Africa) is a rugby union player. He has retired from professional rugby and is now the director of sport at Kearsney College. He stands 190 cm tall and weighs in at 105 kg and plays the position of centre or wing.

He went to Westville Boys High School where he was a prefect and head of school in 2003 and played in the 1st XV in 2003.

Career

Sharks
Parlaying those performances into his debut Super 14 season in 2007, Murray slowly rose to prominence as one of South Africa's leading centres, owing in no small part to his tenacity on defence and astute ball distribution skills, often, with former provincial team-mate Brad Barritt, providing a valuable link to the wings and offering stability to The Sharks midfield. Murray's stunning form saw him being selected for the Springboks away leg of the 2007 Tri Nations as the first choice centres were being rested for the World Cup. However he narrowly missed selection to the victorious South Africa squad for the 2007 Rugby World Cup. The Murray and Barritt partnership was however disrupted after François Steyn's superb performances in the number 12 jersey for the Springboks during the 2007 Rugby World Cup. This meant that Murray had to challenge Barritt for the no. 13 shirt during much of 2008 Super 14 season, but the partnership resumed during the ABSA Currie Cup due to the absence of François Steyn and Adi Jacobs. However, with the return of the Springboks, and with Adi Jacobs' stunning form, Murray saw little game time. Murray was injured during the whole of the 2009 Super 14, and slowly began to be exposed to rugby during the Currie Cup, after a seven-month absence.

Lions

Kings
However, having recently undergone knee surgery, he was struggling for full fitness for a large part of the campaign and made just four starts and three substitute appearances during the Super Rugby season.

Bulls
He failed to break into their Super Rugby squad, however, being limited to six appearances in the 2013 Currie Cup Premier Division and eight in the 2014 Vodacom Cup.

Sharks (2015)
He was released by the Sharks in November 2015.

AS Mâcon
After the 2017 Super Rugby season, Murray moved to France to join Mâcon.

References

1986 births
Living people
Blue Bulls players
Eastern Province Elephants players
Golden Lions players
Lions (United Rugby Championship) players
Rugby union centres
Rugby union players from Durban
Sharks (Currie Cup) players
Sharks (rugby union) players
South Africa international rugby union players
South African rugby union players
Southern Kings players